Irbid Camp is one of the 10 officially recognized UNRWA Palestinian refugee camps in Jordan. It is located outside of Irbid.

It was one of the four camps founded in Jordan to accommodate the refugees of the 1948 Palestinian exodus.

References

Palestinian refugee camps in Jordan
1951 establishments in Jordan
Populated places in Irbid Governorate